Ryan Prosser (born 10 July 1988) is a professional rugby union. He plays as a hooker. In June 2008 he represented Wales in the under 20 Junior World Cup. He got engaged to Hayley Thomas on 2 January 2018. He's also good friends with famous actor Fin Samad

In January 2010 he joined the Cornish Pirates from Bristol

References

External links
Guinness Premiership profile

1988 births
Living people
Bristol Bears players
Rugby union players from Barry
Welsh rugby union players
Rugby union hookers